The Irhazer Shale or Irhazer II Formation is a Middle Jurassic geologic formation of the Irhazer Group in the Agadez Region of Niger. Fossil ornithopod tracks have been reported from the formation. The dinosaur Spinophorosaurus is known from the formation.

Description 
As the overlying Tiouraren Formation of the Irhazer Group, the formation previously had been assigned an Early Cretaceous age.

Fossil content 
The following fossils were reported from the formation:
 Elaphrosaurus iguidiensis
 Ornithopoda indet.
Spinosauridae or Megalosauridae indet.
 Spinophorosaurus nigerensis

See also 

 List of dinosaur-bearing rock formations
 List of stratigraphic units with ornithischian tracks
 Ornithopod tracks
 Lists of fossiliferous stratigraphic units in Africa
 List of fossiliferous stratigraphic units in Niger
 Geology of Niger

References

Bibliography 
 Weishampel, David B.; Dodson, Peter; and Osmólska, Halszka (eds.): The Dinosauria, 2nd, Berkeley: University of California Press. 861 pp. .

Further reading 
 A. F. d. Lapparent. (1960). Les Dinosauriens du "Continental intercalaire" du Saharal central [The dinosaurs of the "Continental Intercalaire" of the central Sahara]. Mémoires de la Société géologique de France, nouvelle série 39(88A):1-57
 K. Remes, F. Ortega, I. Fierro, U. Joger, R. Kosma, J. M. M. Ferrer, Project, Niger Project, O. A. Ide and A. Maga. (2009). A new basal sauropod dinosaur from the Middle Jurassic of Niger and the early evolution of Sauropoda. PLoS One 4(9):e6924:1-13

Geologic formations of Niger
Jurassic System of Africa
Middle Jurassic Africa
Mesozoic Niger
Shale formations
Siltstone formations
Ichnofossiliferous formations
Paleontology in Niger
Formations